St. Andrew's Church Nottingham is a parish church in the Church of England.

Background
The church was built as a daughter church to St. Ann's Church, Nottingham between 1869 and 1871 by William Knight, and extended by Sidney Roberts Stevenson in 1884.

Incumbents

Stained glass
The stained glass windows are by Heaton, Butler and Bayne.

Organ
The organ contains historic pipework from 1777 by John Snetzler taken from the organ formerly installed in St. Mary's Church, Nottingham. It was installed in St. Andrew's Church in 1871 by Lloyd and Dudgeon. In 1876 the organ was re-built by Bishop and Starr, and a further re-build took place in 1898 by Conacher and Co. Other work was carried out by Charles Lloyd in 1914 and 1922. In 1926, Roger Yates added a Tuba. The last re-build was in 1934 by Hill, Norman and Beard.

Organists

Stephen Moore 1871-1874/5
Dr. Briggs 1876
Herbert Stephen Irons  1876-1905 (formerly organist and Rector Chori at Southwell Minster)
Frederick Edward Hollingshead, FRCO. 1905  (formerly organist of Uttoxeter Parish Church, later organist of St. James' Church, Standard Hill)
Dr. Samuel Corbett, FRCO 1905 - 1908 (afterwards organist at Bottesford church)
Leonard Henniker, Mus.B. (Oxon), FRCO, ARCM., 1908 - 1950
Robert Dickinson Sep 1950 - May 1951
Charles Pickard May 1951 - May 1953 (previously organist of Holy Trinity Church, Lenton)
Harry Williams May 1953 - July 1957
Harold E.F. Bebbington July 1957 - Feb 1962 (previously organist of St Peter's Church, Nottingham and Church of St. John the Evangelist, Carrington)
Kenneth J. Eade Feb 1962 - June 1969
David Wilson 1969-1977
Peter Price 1978-1990
Leslie Roberts 1990-1992
John Churchill 1992-

Sources

External links
St Andrew's Church website
Nottingham St. Andrew on the Southwell & Nottingham Church History Project

Nottingham St Andrew
Nottingham St Andrew's Church
Nottingham St Andrew's Church
Churches completed in 1871
19th-century Church of England church buildings